Hat-making or millinery is the design, manufacture and sale of hats and other headwear. A person engaged in this trade is called a milliner or hatter.

Historically, milliners (typically women shopkeepers) produced or imported an inventory of garments for men, women, and children and sold these garments in a millinery shop.
Many milliners worked both as milliners and as fashion designers, such as Rose Bertin (1747-1813), Jeanne Lanvin (1867-1946), and Coco Chanel (1883-1971).

The millinery industry benefited from industrialization during the nineteenth century. In 1889 in London and Paris, over 8,000 women were employed in millinery, and in 1900 in New York, some 83,000 people, mostly women, were employed in millinery. Though the improvements in technology provided benefits to milliners and the whole industry, essential skills, craftsmanship, and creativity are still required. Since the mass-manufacturing of hats began, the term "milliner" is usually used to describe a person who applies traditional hand-craftsmanship to design, make, sell or trim hats primarily for a mostly female clientele.

The term "milliner" or "Milener" originally meant someone from Milan, in northern Italy, in the early 16th century. It referred to Milanese merchants who sold fancy bonnets, gloves, jewellery and cutlery. In the 16th to 18th centuries, the meaning of "milliner" gradually changed in meaning from "a foreign merchant" to "a dealer in small articles relating to dress". Although the term originally applied to men, from 1713 "milliner" gradually came to mean a woman who makes and sells  bonnets and other headgear for women.

Learning of millinery 
Milliners work independently based on job order specifications or their designs, observing the regulations regarding work safety, health protection, environmental protection, and ensuring quality and efficiency. They combine their uniqueness, innovation, and technical skills and use different materials and auxiliary materials. In some cases, they plan and organize their schedules in cooperation with their customers' various needs. They also collaborate with the team or the apprentice to the presentation and sale of the products.

The millinery industry's apprenticeship culture is commonly seen since the 18th century, while milliner was more like a stylist and created hats or bonnets to go with costumes and chose the laces, trims, and accessories to complete an ensemble piece. Millinery apprentices learned hat-making and styling, running the business, and skills to communicate with customers. Nowadays, this apprenticeship is still a standard process for the students who freshly graduated from the millinery schools. Many well-known milliners experienced this stage. For example, Rose Bertin was an apprentice to a successful milliner Mademoiselle Pagelle before her success.

There are many renowned millinery schools located in Europe, especially in London, Paris, and Italy. During the COVID-19, many millinery courses were taught virtually.

Special tools and materials used by milliners 
A wooden hat block is an intricately carved wood form shaped by skillful woodworkers. Hat blocks are the tools of the trade for milliners in creating a unique hat crown shape. Some of the hat blocks are ensembles with crown and brimmed, while some are only with crown or brim or designed for fascinators. Milliners always have an extensive collection of different hat blocks because there are specific hat sizes and custom shapes for every hat block. In the blocking process of a hat, milliners used push pins and a hammer to hold the adjustable string along the crown's collar and the brim's edge.

A floral-making iron is a unique iron used by milliners to create different floral petals or leaves as the ornament for hat decoration. In the past, candles were used to heat these irons with various shapes of metal in one set. Nowadays, these irons are electric. A ball-shaped metal heading is commonly used for the curve of floral pastels.

Milliners often use buckram, a stiff cotton (occasionally linen or horse hair) cloth with a loose weave. Millinery buckram is impregnated with a starch which allows it to be softened in water, pulled over a hat block, and left to dry into a hard shape. Millinery buckram comes in many weights, including lightweight or baby buckram (often used for children's and dolls' hats), single-ply buckram, and double buckram (also known as theatrical buckram or crown buckram).

Notable hatters and milliners
This is a partial list of people who have had a significant influence on hat-making and millinery.

Hatters
 International Hat Company, an American manufacturer credited with inventing one of America's most popular early 20th century harvest hats for field hands, farmers, and workmen. 
 Hawley Products Company, an American manufacturer credited with inventing the tropical shaped, pressed fiber sun helmet used from World War II through the Persian Gulf War.
 John Cavanagh, an American hatter whose innovations included manufacturing regular, long and wide-oval fitting hats to enable customers to find better-fitting ready-to-wear hats. 
 James Lock & Co. of London (founded 1676), is credited with the introduction of the bowler hat in 1849.
 Teofilo Garcia, recognized as a National Living Treasure in the Philippines for pioneering the tabungaw hat, a headwear made from gourd.
 John Batterson Stetson, credited with inventing the classic cowboy hat
 Giuseppe Borsalino, with the famous "Borsalino" Fedora hat.

Milliners
 Vanilla Beane was an American milliner in Washington, D.C. who served the African American community and notable civil rights activists, among others.
 Akio Hirata is the most influential milliner in Japan who collaborated with many Japanese famous fashion designers, including Yohji Yamamoto and Rei Kawakubo. He also created and designed hats for Japanese Empress Michiko since 1966.
 Anna Ben-Yusuf wrote The Art of Millinery (1909), one of the first reference books on millinery technique.
 Rose Bertin, milliner and modiste to Marie Antoinette, is often described as the world's first celebrity fashion designer. 
 Coco Chanel, creator of the fashion house Chanel, and of Chanel No.5.
 John Boyd was one of London's most respected milliners and is known for the famous pink tricorn hat worn by Diana, Princess of Wales.
 Lilly Daché was a famous American milliner of the mid-20th century.
 Frederick Fox was an Australian born milliner noted for his designs for the British Royal family.
 Mildred Blount is the first African American milliner to design hats for Hollywood films "Gone with the Wind' and 'The Easter Parade.' Her clientele included Joan Crawford, Louise Beavers, Marian Anderson, Gloria Vanderbilt, and other Hollywood stars.
 Mr. John was an American milliner considered by some to be the millinery equivalent of Dior in the 1940s and 1950s.
 Stephen Jones of London, is considered one of the world's most radical and important milliners of the late 20th and early 21st centuries.
 Simone Mirman was known for her designs for Elizabeth II and other members of the British Royal Family.
 Barbara Pauli was the leading fashion milliner and modiste in Sweden during the Gustavian era.
 Caroline Reboux was a renowned milliner of the 19th and early 20th centuries.
 David Shilling is a renowned milliner, artist and designer based in Monaco.
 Justin Smith is a milliner creating bespoke and couture hats under the J Smith Esquire brand.
 Philip Treacy Irish-born milliner; first milliner for 80 years to be invited to exhibit at the Paris haute couture shows.

See also
 Draper
 Haberdasher
 Hat Works
 Mad hatter disease
 Mad as a hatter
 Marchandes de modes
 James Lock & Co.
 Walter Wright Hats

References

External links 
 All Sewn Up: Millinery, Dressmaking, Clothing and Costume
 18th Century millinery
 Popular Science, November 1941, "Pulling Hats Out Of Rabbits" article on modern mass production hat making
Individuality in millinery, a 1923 book on hat-making from The Metropolitan Museum of Art Libraries (fully available online as PDF)
Millinery guide (UK)

 
Hats
Fashion occupations